The 2017–18 RFU Intermediate Cup is the 22nd version of the RFU Intermediate Cup (9th using the name RFU Intermediate Cup) national competition for clubs at level 7 of the English rugby union system.  The cup consists of 91 clubs divided into four regions.  The winners of each region then advance to the national semi-finals with the final being held at Twickenham Stadium in London at the end of the season, along with the RFU Intermediate Cup and RFU Junior Vase finals.

The 2017–18 champions were London & South East winners, Camberley, who thrashed Midlands winners, Droitwich, 63–14 in the Twickenham final.  It was Camberley's first ever intermediate cup title, but the 7th won by London & South East based clubs, tying them with the northern region who also had 7 victories.

London & South East Intermediate Cup

The London & South East Intermediate Cup involves a knock-out competition with 1st round, 2nd round, 3rd round, semi-finals and final.   The winners of the London & South East Intermediate Cup then go on to the national Intermediate Cup semi-finals where they face the winners of the South West Intermediate Cup.  There are 25 teams involved in the London & South East Intermediate Cup, all of which are 1st XV sides, coming from the following unions and level 7 leagues.

Round 1

Byes: Barking (L2SE), Camberley (L2SW), Chelmsford (L2NE), Chiswick (L2NW), Dover (L2SE), Gosport & Fareham (L2SW) and Hampstead (L2NW)

Round 2

Round 3

Semi-finals

Final

The winners of the London & South East Intermediate Cup final would advance to the national semi-finals.

Midlands Intermediate Cup

The Midlands Intermediate Cup is a direct knockout cup with a 1st round, 2nd round, 3rd round, quarter-finals, semi-finals and final  The winner of the final goes forward to the National Intermediate Cup semi-finals where they face the winners of the Northern section. The competition involves 41 clubs from the following unions and level 7 leagues:

Round 1

Byes: 23 teams received a bye into the second round

Round 2

Round 3

Quarter-finals

Semi-finals

Final

The winners of the Midlands Intermediate Cup would advance to the National Intermediate Cup semi-finals.

Northern Intermediate Cup

Unlike the other regional competitions, the Northern Intermediate Cup starts with a mini-league stage, in which the eligible clubs are placed in 2 regional pools of 3 teams each.  The winners of each pool then face each other in the Northern Intermediate Cup final, with the winner advancing to the National Intermediate Cup semi-finals, where they will face the winners of the Midlands section.  There are 6 teams (1st XV only) involved in the Northern Intermediate Cup representing the following unions and level 7 leagues:

Pool 1 (West)

Pool 2 (East)

Final

The winners of the Pool 1 (West) and Pool 2 (East) would meet in the Northern Intermediate Cup final.  The winners of this final would then advanced to the National Intermediate Cup semi-finals.

South West Intermediate Cup

The South West Intermediate Cup consist of three stages, with representatives from the different unions joining at different points.  The Dorset & Wilts and Gloucestershire clubs first play in county based knock-out tournaments, with the winners advancing to either the Southern Counties or South West Counties area semi-finals, where they join the other south-west representatives.  The winners of each area final then meet in the South West Intermediate Cup final to determine who goes through to the national semi-finals, where they face the winners of the London and South East section.

The South West Intermediate Cup involves 19 clubs (1st XV only) from the following unions and level 7 leagues:

Stage 1 (Dorset & Wilts)

9 clubs were involved in the Dorset & Wilts RFU Intermediate Cup qualification.  The winners would advanced to the Southern Counties semi-finals.

Stage 1 (Gloucestershire)

7 teams were involved in the Gloucestershire RFU Intermediate Cup qualification tournament.  The winners of the competition would go through to the South West Counties final.

Stage 2 (Southern Counties)

The winners of the Dorset & Wilts Intermediate Cup would join representatives from the Berkshire, Buckinghamshire and Oxfordshire unions in the Southern Counties knock-out stage.  The winners would advance to play the South West Counties winners in the south-west regional final.

Stage 2 (South West Counties)

The winners of the Gloucestershire Intermediate Cup would meet the representatives from the Somerset RFU in the semi-final, while the representatives from the Cornwall RFU would face the representatives from the Devon RFU.  The winners would advance to play the Southern Counties winners in the south-west regional final.

Stage 3 (South West final)

The winners of the Southern Counties and South West Counties final would meet in the south-west regional final.  The winners of this final would then advanced to the national semi-finals.

National Senior Vase

4 teams qualified from the regional vase competitions:
London & South East Intermediate Cup winners – Camberley (L2SW)
Midlands Intermediate Cup winners – Droitwich (M2WS)
Northern Intermediate Cup winners – York (Y1)
South West Intermediate Cup winners – Coney Hill (WCN)

The Midlands winners would face the North winners in the first semi-final, while the London & South East winners would face the South-West winners in the other, with the winners of each semi-final meeting in the Twickenham final.  Home advantage in the semi-finals will be decided by a draw.

Semi-finals

Final

Notes

See also
 2017–18 Anglo-Welsh Cup
 2017–18 British and Irish Cup
 2017–18 RFU Senior Vase
 2017–18 RFU Junior Vase
 English rugby union system
 List of English rugby union teams
 Rugby union in England

References

External links
 RFU

2017–18 rugby union tournaments for clubs
Rugby union competitions in England
Rugby union cup competitions in England